Myat Thidar Tun (born 7 October 1981) is a Burmese politician and lawyer currently serving as an Amyotha Hluttaw MP for Mon State No. 5 constituency. She is a member of the National League for Democracy.

Early life and education
Myat was born on 7 October 1981 in Mandalay, Myanmar. She graduated with A.G.T.I (MT) from Government Technical Institute (Mawlamyine) and LL.B from Mawlamyaing University. She is also a lawyer.

Political career
She is a member of the National League for Democracy. In the 2015 Myanmar general election, she was elected as an Amyotha Hluttaw MP, winning a majority of 24375 votes and elected representative from Mon State No. 5 parliamentary constituency.

References

Living people
1981 births
People from Mandalay
Members of the House of Nationalities
National League for Democracy politicians
Burmese women lawyers
21st-century Burmese lawyers